Miguel Rafael Martos Sánchez (born 5 May 1943), often simply referred to as Raphael, is a Spanish singer and television, film and theater actor. Raphael is recognized as one of the most successful Spanish singers in the world, having sold more than 70 million records worldwide in 7 languages. Currently, he is considered one of the most active singers of the so-called "divos of the romantic ballad", touring throughout America and Europe, transmitting for 60 years of artistic career, a repertoire full of novelty, for which his oldest songs are being recorded again,thus remastering with modern sounds closer to today's youth.

Childhood 
Raphael was born Miguel Rafael Martos Sánchez in Linares, province of Jaén (Spain). As a consequence, he is nicknamed both "El Ruiseñor de Linares" ("Nightingale of Linares") and "El Divo de Linares" ("The Divo from Linares") but is also known as "El Niño". His family moved to Madrid when he was nine months old, and he started singing when he was just three years-old. He joined a children's choir at age four. When he was 9, he was recognized as the best child voice in Europe at a contest in Salzburg, Austria. His two idols, when he was growing up, and with whom he announced, on 6 October 2014, his plans to record posthumous duets with, were said to be US singer Elvis Presley and French diva Edith Piaf.

Career

First recordings 

Raphael began his professional career by singing with the Dutch record label Philips. To distinguish himself, he adopted the "ph" of the company's name and christened himself 'Raphael'. His first singles were "Te voy a contar mi vida" and "A pesar de todo", among others. Raphael adopted his own peculiar singing style from the beginning; he is known for acting each one of his songs while on stage, emphasizing his gestures with high dramatic effect.  It is not unusual for Raphael to ad lib lyrics as to localize a song depending on the venue he's singing at, wear Latin American peasant costumes and dance folk dances within a song, kicking and demolishing a mirror, or doing the moves of a flamenco dancer or a bullfighter onstage. He also possesses a wide vocal range, which he often used in the beginning of his career as to evoke a choirboy approach to some songs.

From Benidorm and Eurovision to becoming an international star  

When he was nineteen, he won first, second and third awards at the famous Benidorm International Song Festival, Spain, in 1962 and 1963 with the songs: "Llevan", "Inmensidad" and "Tu Conciencia".  After a brief relation with Barclay record label, who produced just an EP, he signed a contract with Hispavox recording company, and began a long artistic relationship with the musical director of this label, the late, talented Argentinian orchestrator Waldo de los Ríos and intensify the partnership with outstanding Spanish songwriter Manuel Alejandro.

This marked Spain's strongest showing in the contest at the time, leaving the door open for victory the following year, which Spain achieved with "La, la, la" performed by Massiel. This served as a turning point in Raphael's career, making him an international star. He traveled and performed worldwide in Europe, Latin America, Puerto Rico, the United States, Russia and Japan. Songs such as "Yo soy aquel" (his signature song), "Cuando tú no estás", "Mi gran noche", "Digan lo que digan", "Tema de amor", "Estuve enamorado" and "Desde aquel día" cemented his status as a major international singing star.
 
Raphael also began a lucrative film career, appearing in, Cuando tú no estás (Mario Camus, 1966), which was followed by Al ponerse el Sol (Mario Camus, 1967) Digan lo que digan (Mario Camus, 1968, filmed in Argentina), El golfo (1969, filmed in México), El ángel (1969), Sin Un Adiós (1970, partially filmed in England) and Volveré a nacer (1972).

Latin American popularity 

As Raphael became a success in Latin America, he made a habit of recording Latin American folk standards including "Huapango torero", "Sandunga" and "Llorona"; they were hits in Mexico. In 1967 Raphael began a tour throughout America.

American and Spanish television appearances 

He appeared live on The Ed Sullivan Show with great success on 25 October 1970, singing (in Spanish, English and Italian) "Hallelujah" and "Hava Nagila".  He appeared again on 27 December 1970, with the songs "Maybe" (Somos), "When my love is around" (Cuando llega mi amor) and "The sound of the trumpet" (Balada de la trompeta).

In 1975, Raphael began his own successful program on Spanish Television called El Mundo de Raphael, where he sang with international stars.  He also had a radio program, where he and his wife spoke with and interviewed outstanding personalities, and he starred in soap operas, starting with the Mexican production Donde termina el camino, shown in the spring of 1978 and later in other countries like Peru and Chile.

Golden 80s 

Raphael succeeded in the early 1980s with songs such as "¿Qué tal te va sin mí?", "Como yo te amo", "En carne viva" and "Estar enamorado".  

In 1980 Raphael receives a Uranium disc, in recognition of his fifty million copies sold throughout his recording career.

During 1984 and 1985 he recorded two albums with songs written by José Luis Perales like "Ámame", "Yo sigo siendo aquel", "Dile que vuelva", "Y... Cómo es él" and "Estoy llorando hoy por ti".

In 1984 a parody of "Yo soy aquél" was used in a radio spot in Puerto Rico's gubernatorial race. Then-governor Carlos Romero Barceló used the parody (complete with a Raphael sound-alike) namely as a jab against opponent, Raphael's namesake, (and noted Spanophile), former governor Rafael Hernández Colón. Raphael was surprised by the unauthorized use of the music, but was highly amused by the reference.

In 1987 he left Hispavox and signed a contract with Columbia (now Sony Music), where he again recorded songs written by Roberto Livi like "Toco madera" and "Maravilloso corazón".  In 1991 he had a hit with "Escándalo" in Spain, Latin America, and in Japan, where it reached number one.  At the end of the 1990s, after ending a contract with PolyGram, he went back to EMI.  In 1998 the artist published the first part of his memoirs titled ¿Y mañana qué?, from his childhood until his marriage in 1972.

Raphael took part in the 2000 Spanish version of the stage musical Jekyll & Hyde for seven months, with great success.

Personal life
He married aristocrat, journalist and writer Natalia Figueroa, in Venice (Italy) on 14 July 1972. They have three children: Jacobo, Alejandra and Manuel.

Raphael's health faced a major setback in 2003, when his liver started failing due to a latent bout with hepatitis B; he recovered successfully after a transplant. Since then he is an active organ donation promoter.

Awards and accomplishments

Raphael has received numerous awards. 

He was inducted into the International Latin Music Hall of Fame in 2003.

Recently Raphael received the Lifetime Achievement Award at the 2022 Billboard Latin Music Awards.

Discography
 Raphael (1965)
 Raphael Canta (1966)
 Al Ponerse El Sol (1967)
 Digan Lo Que Digan (1967)
 El Golfo (1968)
 Huapango Torero + 3 (EP – México) (1969)
 El Angel (1969) – Ecuador Only
 Raphael – El Idolo (Philips EP's Compilation) (1969) 
 Aqui! (1969)
 Corazón, Corazón (1970) México
 Live at the Talk of the Town (1970) (recorded at the London Talk of the Town)
 Aleluya... (1970)
 Algo Más (1971)
 Háblame De Amor (From 'Top Star Festival' LP) (1971)
 Volveré A Nacer (1972)
 Le Llaman Jesús! (1973)
 From Here On... (1973) – English Album
 Raphael (A La Huella...) (1974)
 Raphael (De... Para...) (1974)
 Qué Dirán De Mí (1974) 
 Sombras + 3 (1974) (EP. – Ecuador)
 No Eches La Culpa Al Gitano (From "Juntos Para Ayudarte" LP) (1974)
 Recital Hispanoamericano (1975) – With Los Gemelos
 Con El Sol De La Mañana (1976)
 Raphael Canta... (1976)
 El Cantor (1977) (México)
 Una Forma Muy Mía De Amar (1978)
 Y... Sigo Mi Camino (1980)
 Vivo Live Direct – 20th Anniversary (Live Double Album) (1980)
 En Carne Viva (1981)
 Raphael: Ayer, Hoy y Siempre (1982)
 Enamorado De La Vida (1983)
 Eternamente Tuyo (1984)
 Yo Sigo Siendo Aquel – 25th Anniversary (1985) 
 Todo Una Vida (1986)
 Las Apariencias Engañan (1988)
 Maravilloso Corazón, Maravilloso (1989)
 Andaluz (1990)
 Ave Fénix (1992)
 Fantasía (1994)
 Desde el fondo de mi alma (1995)
 Punto y Seguido (1997)
 Vete (1997) – Duet with Nino Bravo
 Jekyll & Hyde (2001)
 Maldito Raphael (2001)
 De Vuelta (2003)
 Vuelve Por Navidad (2004)
 A Que No Te Vas (2006) – Duet with Rocio Jurado
 Cerca de ti (2006)
 Maravilloso Raphael (2007)
 Raphael 50 Anos Después (CD + DVD) (2008)
 Viva Raphael! (2009)
 50 Años Después – En Directo y Al Completo (3 CD + DVD) (2009)
 Te Llevo En El Corazón (3 CD + DVD) (2010)
 Te Llevo En El Corazón. Essential (2011)
 El Reencuentro (2012)
 El Reencuentro En Directo (CD + DVD) (2012)
 Mi Gran Noche (2013)
 50 Exitos De Mi Vida (3 CD + DVD) (2013)
 De Amor & Desamor (LP + CD) (2014)
 Raphael Sinphónico (CD + DVD) (2015)
 Ven A Mi Casa Esta Navidad (CD) (2015)
 Infinitos Bailes (LP + CD) (2016)
 6.0 En Concierto (2021)
 Victoria (2022)

Filmography
 Las Gemelas (1963) – As Alberto
 Cuando Tú No Estás (1966) – As Rafael
 Al Ponerse El Sol (1967) – As David Alonso
 Digan lo que digan (1968) – As Rafael Gandía
 El Golfo (1968)- As Pancho
 El Ángel (1969)- As El Angel
 Sin Un Adiós (1970) – As Mario Leiva
 Volveré A Nacer (1973) – As Alex
 Rafael en Raphael (Documentary) (1974) – As himself
 Donde Termina El Camino (TV) (1978)- As Manuel
 Ritmo, Amor y Primavera (1981) – As himself
 Jekyll & Hyde (Musical) (2000) –  As Dr. Jekyll and Mr. Hyde
 Balada Triste de Trompeta" (The Last Circus) (2010) – As himself, through use of Sin Un Adiós footage
 Mi Gran Noche'' (2015) – As Alphonso

Tours 
 De vuelta Tour (2003-2004)
 Raphael Para todos Tour (2005)
 Más cerca de ti Tour (2007-2008)
 50 años después Tour (2009-2010)
 Te llevo en el corazón Tour (2010-2011)
 El reencuentro Tour (2012) 
 Mi gran noche Tour (2013–2014)
 De Amor y Desamor Tour (2014–2015)
 Raphael Sinphonico World Tour (2015–2016)
 Loco por Cantar World Tour (2017-2018)
 Raphael RESinphónico World Tour (2018–2020)
 Raphael 6.0: 60 años sobre los escenarios (2020-2022)
 Raphael Tour 6.0 In America (2022)
 Tour Victoria (2022-)

Raphael Museum 

The Raphael Museum is located in El Pósito, a very beautiful building in the centre of Linares. It houses more than 400 pieces and original documents from the artist.

Notes

References

External links

 Raphael's official site
 Raphael's Worldwide site
 Raphael's Russian site, the biggest in the world
 Letra de su canción Yo Soy Aquél (Spanish and English)
 Letra de su canción Hablemos Del Amor (Spanish and English)

1943 births
Living people
People from Linares, Jaén
Eurovision Song Contest entrants for Spain
Eurovision Song Contest entrants of 1966
Eurovision Song Contest entrants of 1967
Spanish male singers
Singers from Andalusia
EMI Latin artists
Sony Music Latin artists